Bill Scott (3 November 1886 – 10 November 1960) was  a former Australian rules footballer who played with Richmond in the Victorian Football League (VFL).

Notes

External links 
		

1886 births
1960 deaths
Australian rules footballers from Victoria (Australia)
Richmond Football Club players
Euroa Football Club players